This is a list capital ships of Sweden of the period 1550-1859:

List
Note: Armament could vary over time.

 Elefant (65), 1558. Wrecked 1564.
 Finska Svan (82), 1559.
 Svenska Hektor (87), c. 1559. Discarded 1590?
 St Christopher (58), 1562.
 Engel (49), 1545.
 St Erik (90), 1559. Discarded 1585.
 , also known as Makalös and Jutehatar (107), c. 1563. Burnt 1564.
 Enhörning (41), 1564. Discarded 1577 or 1578.
 Stockholms Hjort (53)
 Förgylta Dufva (48), 1564.
 Hjort (50), 1563.
 Röda Hund (44), captured 1562. Sold c. 1572.
 Brämaren (46), 1560s.
 Lilla Svan (50)
 Lilia (44), 1562. Sold 1570.
 Lilla Hjort (40)
 Bruna Lejon (40), captured from Livonia 1563.
 Röda Gripen (37), captured from Livonia 1563.
 Skotska Pincka (56), ex-Danish Skotske Pink, captured from Denmark 1564. Captured by Denmark 1569.
 Hector (38), captured from Denmark 1563. Sunk.
 Svenska Morian (54)
 Tranheje (75)
 Bruna Lejon (45), 1563.
 Memnon (46), 1564 or 1565.
 Jonas von Emden (45), 1565.
 Hollands Galej (43), 1557 or 1558. Discarded 1570.
 Kalmar Bark (48), 1556. Discarded 1578 or 1579.
 Röda Drake (100), c. 1570. Discarded 1592?
 Röda Lejon (40), 1563. Wrecked 1572.
 Finska Memnon (46), 1564 or 1565. Condemned c. 1574.
 Tre Kronor (39), ex-Danish Vite Örn, captured from Denmark while building c. 1598. Discarded c. 1625.
 Vasa (50), 1599. Burnt 1623.
 Äpplet (50), c. 1603.
 Äpplet (74), c. 1622. Sold back to builders 1625.
 Äpplet (66), c. 1628. Sunk 1659.
 Kristina (36), 1624. Wrecked 1628.
 Jupiter (50), c. 1633. Sold to France 1647.
 Mars (44), c. 1633. Discarded 1660.
 Kronan Ark (68), c. 1633. Sunk 1675.
 Göta Ark (72), 1634. Discarded 1650.
 Scepter (58), 1636. Sunk 1675.
 Patentia (48), c. 1616, ex-Danish Patientia (49), captured 1644.
 Oldenburg (42), c. 1628, ex-Danish Oldenborg (32), captured 1644. Condemned 1660.
 Tre Lejon (46), c. 1642, ex-Danish Tre Løver (38), captured 1644. Sunk 1667.
 Andromeda (44), 1649 or 1650. Wrecked 1654 or 1655.
 Vestervik (44), bought 1647. Burnt 1676.
 Cesar (54), c. 1648. Captured by Denmark 1677 and renamed Julius Caesar.
 Maria (54), c. 1648. Condemned 1677.
 Sankt Anna (46), c. 1649. Given to France 1650.
 Wismar (44), c. 1649. Given away 1692.
 Herkules (58), 1654. Rebuilt 1689-90, sunk 1710.
 Carolus (54), 1650. Renamed Carolus IX 1678, sunk 1692?
 Merkurius (46), c. 1652. Renamed Falken (40), c. 1670, captured by Denmark 1675 and renamed Svenske Falk.
 Falken (46), c. 1652. Sold to Portugal c. 1670.
 Amarant (46), 1654. Captured by Denmark 1677 and renamed Amirante.
 Apollo (46), bought 1654. Sunk 1677.
 Draken (64), 1656. Captured by Denmark 1677 and renamed Drage.
 Mane (46), bought 1655. Sunk 1698.
 Göteborg (48), 1656. Condemned 1681.
 Viktoria (74), 1658. Sunk 1688?
 Pelikan (40), ex-Danish Pelikan (36), captured 1658. Captured by the Dutch Republic 1658.
 Delmenhorst (26), ex-Danish Delmenhorst (44), captured 1658. Captured by the Dutch Republic 1658.
 Ulven (44), 1642, ex-Danish Graa Ulv (36), captured 1659. Sunk 1670.
 Fenix (41), c. 1650, ex-Danish Foniks (40), captured 1659. Pram 1679.
 Andromeda (52), c. 1659. Hulk 1692.
 Monikendam (42), c. 1640, ex-Dutch Monnikendam (28), captured 1659. Lighter 1676.
 Äpplet (90), 1661. Wrecked 1676.
 Svärdet (90), 1662. Burnt 1676.
 Saturnus (66), 1662. Renamed Bahus/Bohus (74), 1687, sunk 1707.
 Wrangel (64), 1664. Discarded 1713.
 Nyckel (84), 1665. Burnt 1679.
 Jupiter (70), 1665. Renamed Uppland 1689, sunk 1710.
 Spes (48), 1666. Wrecked 1697.
 Mars (70), c. 1667. Captured by Denmark 1677.
 Solen (70), c. 1667. Sunk 1694.
 Venus (68), 1667. Renamed Finland 1685, sunk 1706.
 Kronan (128), 1668. Capsized and exploded, 1676.
 Svenska Lejonet (40/52), 1656. Captured by Denmark 1677 and renamed Svenske Løve.
 Wismar (58), c. 1694.
 Merkurius (68), 1672. Captured by the Dutch Republic 1677.
 Neptunus (44), c. 1673. Captured by Denmark 1676.
 (Sankt) Hieronymus (70), bought 1675. Captured by the Dutch Republic and given to Denmark, 1677.
 Wrangels Palats (44), hired 1675. Captured by Denmark 1677.
 Laxen (50), c. 1677. Captured by Denmark 1679.
 Kalmar (62), c. 1677. Burnt 1677.
 Carolus XI (82), 1678. Renamed Sverige 1683, Wenden 1684, Prins Carl 1694, Sverige 1694. Discarded 1721.
 Drottning Ulrika (70), c. 1680. Renamed Prinsessan Ulrika Eleonora 1692, Victoria 1694. Sunk 1714.
 Göta (76), c. 1684. Discarded 1712.
 Drottning Hedvig Eleanora (70), 1680. Renamed Sverige 1694, renamed Småland 1694, Discarded 1729.
 Karlskrona (70), 1686. Discarded 1730.
 Wrangel (70)
 Upland (70) 
 Hercules (62)
 Öland (56), 1681. Wrecked 1705.
 Wachtmeister (56), c. 1681. Captured by Russia at the Battle of Ösel Island, 4 June 1719.
 Prins Carl (76), 1682. Renamed Stockholm 1694. Sunk 1710.
 Halland (56), c. 1682. Sunk 1722.
 Gotland (56), c. 1682. Sunk 1722.
 Lifland (56), c. 1682. Sunk 1726.
 Blekinge (70), 1682. Sunk 1713.
 Estland (56), c. 1683. Sunk 1732.
 Osel (56), c. 1683. Discarded 1718.
 Konung Karl (90), c. 1683. Renamed Drottning Hedvig Eleonora 1694, sunk 1712.
 Carolus IX (56), c. 1650. Discarded 1684.
 Mane (42)
 Carolus (110), 1694. Discarded 1771.
 Princessa Hedvig (80), 1692. Launched as Drottning Ulrika Eleonora, renamed Wenden 1694, Prinsessan Hedvig Sofia 1694. Sunk 1715.
 Wenden (72)
 Viktoria (80), c. 1690. Renamed Prinsessan Ulrika Eleonora 1694, aground and burnt, 1710.
 Pommern (56), c. 1692. Discarded 1770.
 Södermanland (56), c. 1693. Captured by Denmark 1715 and renamed Sydermanland.
 Kalmar (46), 1695. Scuttled 1719.
 Stettin (46), 1695. Scuttled 1719.
 Enigheten (94), c. 1696. Rearmed to 66 guns 1730, renamed Konung Fredrik 1732, sunk 1785.
 Westmanland (62), c. 1696. Rebuilt 1727, discarded 1778.
 Göteborg (48), c. 1696. Captured by Denmark 1715.
 Skåne (64), c. 1697. Rebuilt 1728, BU 1768.
 Wrede (52), c. 1697. Lost at sea 1711.
 Frederika Amalia (62), c. 1698. Rebuilt 1747, discarded 1776.
 Norrköping (52), c. 1698. Wrecked 1708.
 Wismar (46), c. 1694.
 Warberg (42), captured by Denmark 1719.
 Elfsborg (42)
 Götha Lejon (90), c. 1702. Discarded 1745.
 Nordstjernan (76), 1703. Captured by Denmark 1715 and renamed Nordstjern.
 Prins Carl Fredrik (72), c. 1704. Sold 1797.
 Bremen (64), c. 1705. Sold 1781.
 Öland (50), c. 1705. Wrecked 1742.
 Tre Kronor (86), c. 1706. Aground and burnt, 1710.
 Werden (54), c. 1706. Discarded 1754.
 Nya Riga (54), c. 1708. Blew up 1717.
 Stockholm (68), c. 1708. Sold 1781.
 Fredrika/Prinsessa Fredrika von Hessen (52), scuttled, captured by Denmark and refloated, 1719.
 Halmstad (54), scuttled 1719.
 Prins Carl (90)
 Kronskepp (40), c. 1710, ex-Russian, captured 1713/14 on delivery voyage, ex-French Le Beau Parterre, ex-Dutch Schonauwen, captured 1711. Discarded 1722?
 Ulrika Eleonora (84), 1719. Discarded 1765.
 Greve Sparre (52), c. 1724.
 (Prinsesse), Sophia Charlotta (60), c. 1725. Sold 1781.
 Fred (42), c. 1730.
 Friheten (66), c. 1731. Sold 1781.
 Drottningholm (42), c. 1731.
 Hessen Cassel (64), c. 1731. Renamed Hertig Ferdinand 1779. Discarded 1807.
 Enigheten (70), 1732. Burnt 1790.
 Sverige (80), c. 1734. Wrecked 1738 during transfer to Turkey.
 Prins Wilhelm (54), c. 1726. Sold 1781.
 Finland (60/64), c. 1735. Captured by Russia in the Battle of Vyborg Bay, 3 July 1790.
 (Konung) Adolf Fredrik (62), c. 1744. Renamed Riksens Ständer 1770, aground and burnt, 13 May 1790.
 (Greve) Sparre (54), c. 1748.
 Uppland (50), c. 1749. Captured by Russia in the Battle of Vyborg Bay, 3 July 1790.
 Södermanland (50), c. 1749. Renamed Gripen, discarded 1810.
 Gotha (66)
 Fredrik Rex (62), c. 1742. Sold 1795.
 Prins Carl (64), c. 1758. Captured by Russia at the Battle of Reval, 13 May 1790.
 Prins Gustaf (70), 1758. Captured by Russia at the Battle of Hogland, 17 July 1788.
 (Prinsessin) Sophia Albertina (60/72/74/80), c. 1764. Wrecked in storm 20 August 1781.
 (Drottning) Sofia Magdalena (74), 1774. Captured by Russia at the Battle of Vyborg Bay, 3 July 1790.
 (Prins) Fredrik Adolph (62), 1774. Discarded 1825.
 (Konung) Adolph Fredrik (70), 1775. Discarded 1825.
 (Konung) Gustaf III (70), 1777. Discarded 1825.

Wasa class
 Wasa (60), 1778. Discarded 1827.
 Hedvig Elisabet Charlotta (60), c. 1781. Captured by Russia at the Battle of Vyborg Bay, 3 July 1790.
Kronprins Gustaf Adolph class (improved Wasa class), 
 Kronprins Gustaf Adolph (62), 1782. Captured by Russia at the Battle of Hogland, 17 July 1788, and renamed Prints Gustav, lost at sea 1797.
 Fädenerslandet (62), 1783. Discarded 1864.
 Ömheten (62), 1783. Captured by Russia at the Battle of Vyborg Bay, 3 July 1790.
 Rättvisan (62), 1783. Captured by Russia at the Battle of Vyborg Bay, 3 July 1790, captured by Britain 1808.
 Dygden (62), 1784. Internal explosion and fire 1793.
 Äran (62), 1784. Rebuilt as frigate Göteborg 1839, sold 1874.
 Försiktigheten (62), 1784. Discarded 1825.
 Dristigheten (62), 1785. Discarded 1867.
 Manligheten (62), 1785. Discarded 1864.
 Tapperheten (62), 1785. To Gran Colombia as Bolivar 1825, sold at auction September 1826, to Portugal by 1848.
 Wladislaff (74), ex-Russian Vladislav, captured 17 July 1788 at the Battle of Hogland. Discarded 1819.
 Louisa Ulrika (72), c. 1789. Ex-East Indiaman. Captured by Russia at the Battle of Vyborg Bay, 3 July 1790.
 Konung Gustaf IV (74), 1799. Renamed Gustaf den Store 1809, renamed Försiktigheten 1825. Discarded 1871.
 Carl XIII (84), 1819. Discarded 1862.
 Karl XIV Johan (84), 1824. Rearmed to 68. Discarded 1865.
 Prins Oscar (76), 1830. Dicarded 1869.
 Gustav den Store (76), c. 1832.
 Stockholm (66), 1856. Discarded 1921.

References

Sources
 
 

Naval ships of Sweden
Capital
Sweden
Swedish Navy lists
Lists of ships of the line